Charles Howard (May 1873 – August 14, 1904), nicknamed "Doc", was an American Negro league outfielder in the 1890s.

A native of Pennsylvania, Howard played for the Cuban Giants in 1897 and the Cuban X-Giants the following two seasons. He died in East Liverpool, Ohio in 1904 at age 31. Howard was shot and killed by a woman he had been attacking.

References

External links
Baseball statistics and player information from Baseball-Reference Black Baseball Stats and Seamheads

1873 births
1904 deaths
Date of birth missing
Place of birth missing
Cuban Giants players
Cuban X-Giants players
20th-century African-American people
Deaths by firearm in Ohio